Dopravní podnik Ostrava (DPO) is a city transport company from Ostrava, Czech Republic. The company operates trolleybuses, trams and buses. The transport company was formed in 1949 from a merger of the companies Společnost moravských místních drah, Zemských drah, Místní drahy Ostrava-Karviná and Vítkovické závodní dráhy. Today DPO is entirely owned by the City of Ostrava. DPO today owns 64 trolleybuses, 272 trams and 299 buses.

Lines 

DPO runs 16 tramway lines, 13 trolleybus lines and 52 bus lines. The first tram line was opened on 18 August 1894 from the train station to Vítkovice. It was opened to the public on 1 May 1901. Steam trams ran until 1922. Trolleybuses have operated in Ostrava since 1952. The first line was a circular one from Náměstí Republiky to Prokešovo náměstí. DPO wanted new lines in 2014. Buses have operated in Ostrava since 1930.

References

External links 

  

Transport in Ostrava